Brokenshire is a surname of Cornish origin. The original derivation of the surname is unclear. It is found in the early 1600s, and possibly earlier, in the area around Roche, Cornwall, and formed a diaspora from there. Suggestions that Brokenshire is a regional variant of the early English /  Yorkshire surname Burkinshaw, or similar, are unhelpful, since there is no explanation of the geographical split nor variance. It seems likely that the surname Brokenshire arose independently in Cornwall.

Brokenshire does not appear as a first name, but occurs as a surname in English-speaking countries.

List of persons with the surname
 David Brokenshire (1925–2014) – New Zealand architect and potter
 Geoff Brokenshire (1922–1986) – Australian rules footballer
 Herbert Cecil Brokenshire (1896-1944) - American doctor, who founded Brokenshire College, Philippines
 James Brokenshire, PC, MP (1968–2021) – British politician
 Laurie Brokenshire (1952–2017) – Royal Navy officer and British puzzlist
 Mark Brokenshire (born 1961) – Australian rugby league player
 Norman Brokenshire (1898–1965) – Canadian and American radio announcer
 Robert Brokenshire (born 1957) – Australian dairy farmer and politician

See also
Cornish surnames
Shire

References

Surnames
Patronymic surnames
Anglo-Cornish surnames
Surnames of British Isles origin
Surnames of English origin
English-language surnames